The Abia State gubernatorial election of 2011 was the fourth gubernatorial election of Abia State. The election was held on April 26, 2011, with Theodore Orji of the People's Democratic Party declared winner for a second term in office after defeating the All Progressives Grand Alliance nominee Reagan Ufomba.

Results

References

Abia State gubernatorial elections
Abia gubernatorial
Abia gubernatorial election